The Twenty-Fifth Canadian Ministry was the cabinet chaired by Prime Minister Kim Campbell.  It governed Canada from 25 June 1993 to 4 November 1993, including only the last two months of the 34th Canadian Parliament.  The government was formed by the Progressive Conservative Party of Canada and was the last ministry to be led by that party, which merged with another party to form the Conservative Party of Canada in 2003.

Ministers

References

Succession

25
Ministries of Elizabeth II
1993 establishments in Canada
1993 disestablishments in Canada
Cabinets established in 1993
Cabinets disestablished in 1993